This page gathers the results of municipal elections in Veneto, Italy in the region's five major cities (more than 80,000 inhabitants), since 1993.

1993–2000

1993 municipal elections

|- 
!align=left rowspan=2 valign=center bgcolor="#E9E9E9"|
!colspan="3" align="center" valign=top bgcolor="lightgrey"|Christian Democracy
!colspan="3" align="center" valign=top bgcolor="pink"|Alliance of Progressives
!colspan="3" align="center" valign=top bgcolor="lightgreen"|Lega Nord
!colspan="1" align="center" valign=top bgcolor="#E9E9E9"|Others
|-
|align="left" bgcolor="lightgrey"|candidate
|align="center" bgcolor="lightgrey"|1st round
|align="center" bgcolor="lightgrey "|2nd round
|align="left" bgcolor="pink"|candidate
|align="center" bgcolor="pink"|1st round
|align="center" bgcolor="pink"|2nd round
|align="left" bgcolor="lightgreen"|candidate
|align="center" bgcolor="lightgreen"|1st round
|align="center" bgcolor="lightgreen"|2nd round
|align="center" bgcolor="#E9E9E9"|1st round
|-
|align="left" valign=top bgcolor="#E9E9E9"|Venice
|align="left" valign=top bgcolor="lightgrey" |Giovanni Castellani(Christian Democracy)
|align="center" valign=top bgcolor="lightgrey"|23.4%
|align="center" valign=top bgcolor="lightgrey"|–
|align="left" valign=top bgcolor="pink"|Massimo Cacciari(Democratic Party of the Left)
|align="center" valign=top bgcolor="pink"|42.3%
|align="center" valign=top bgcolor="pink"|55.4%
|align="left" bgcolor="lightgreen"|Aldo Mariconda(Liga Veneta–Lega Nord)
|align="center" valign=top bgcolor="lightgreen"|26.5%
|align="center" valign=top bgcolor="lightgreen"|44.6%
|align="center" valign=top bgcolor="#E9E9E9"|7.8%
|}
Sourcea: Regional Council of Veneto and Corriere della Sera

1994 municipal elections

|- 
!align=left rowspan=2 valign=center bgcolor="#E9E9E9"|
!colspan="3" align="center" valign=top bgcolor="lightblue"|Pole of Freedoms
!colspan="3" align="center" valign=top bgcolor="pink"|Alliance of Progressives & PPI
!colspan="3" align="center" valign=top bgcolor="lightgreen"|Lega Nord
!colspan="1" align="center" valign=top bgcolor="#E9E9E9"|Others
|-
|align="left" bgcolor="lightblue"|candidate
|align="center" bgcolor="lightblue"|1st round
|align="center" bgcolor="lightblue"|2nd round
|align="left" bgcolor="pink"|candidate
|align="center" bgcolor="pink"|1st round
|align="center" bgcolor="pink"|2nd round
|align="left" bgcolor="lightgreen"|candidate
|align="center" bgcolor="lightgreen"|1st round
|align="center" bgcolor="lightgreen"|2nd round
|align="center" bgcolor="#E9E9E9"|1st round
|-
|align="left" valign=top bgcolor="#E9E9E9"|Verona
|align="left" valign=top bgcolor="lightblue" |Michela Sironi(Forza Italia)Massimo Galli Righi(National Alliance)
|align="center" valign=top bgcolor="lightblue"|29.5%9.5%
|align="center" valign=top bgcolor="lightblue"|61.5%
|align="left" valign=top bgcolor="pink"|Dario Donella(Democratic Party of the Left)Gian Antonio Vaccaro(Italian People's Party)
|align="center" valign=top bgcolor="pink"|22.6%14.4%
|align="center" valign=top bgcolor="pink"|39.5%
|align="left" valign=top bgcolor="lightgreen"|Giovanni Maccagnani(Liga Veneta–Lega Nord)
|align="center" valign=top bgcolor="lightgreen"|17.3%
|align="center" valign=top bgcolor="lightgreen"|with Sironi
|align="center" valign=top bgcolor="#E9E9E9"|16.2%
|-
|align="left" valign=top bgcolor="#E9E9E9"|Treviso
|align="left" valign=top bgcolor="lightblue"|Stefano Cerniato(Forza Italia)Alberto Di Pasquale(National Alliance)
|align="center" valign=top bgcolor="lightblue"|15.9%10.8%
|align="center" valign=top bgcolor="lightblue"|–
|align="left" valign=top bgcolor="pink"|Aldo Tognana(Italian People's Party)
|align="center" valign=top bgcolor="pink"|29.9%
|align="center" valign=top bgcolor="pink"|45.2%
|align="left" valign=top bgcolor="lightgreen"|Giancarlo Gentilini(Liga Veneta–Lega Nord)
|align="center" valign=top bgcolor="lightgreen"|23.0%
|align="center" valign=top bgcolor="lightgreen"|54.8%
|align="center" valign=top bgcolor="#E9E9E9"|20.3%
|}
Source: Regional Council of Veneto

1995 municipal elections

|- 
!align=left rowspan=2 valign=center bgcolor="#E9E9E9"|
!colspan="3" align="center" valign=top bgcolor="lightblue"|Pole of Freedoms
!colspan="3" align="center" valign=top bgcolor="pink"|Alliance of Progressives & PPI
!colspan="3" align="center" valign=top bgcolor="lightgreen"|Lega Nord & allies
!colspan="1" align="center" valign=top bgcolor="#E9E9E9"|Others
|-
|align="left" bgcolor="lightblue"|candidate
|align="center" bgcolor="lightblue"|1st round
|align="center" bgcolor="lightblue"|2nd round
|align="left" bgcolor="pink"|candidate
|align="center" bgcolor="pink"|1st round
|align="center" bgcolor="pink"|2nd round
|align="left" bgcolor="lightgreen"|candidate
|align="center" bgcolor="lightgreen"|1st round
|align="center" bgcolor="lightgreen"|2nd round
|align="center" bgcolor="#E9E9E9"|1st round
|-
|align="left" valign=top bgcolor="#E9E9E9"|Padua
|align="left" valign=top bgcolor="lightblue" |Francesco Gentile(Forza Italia)
|align="center" valign=top bgcolor="lightblue"|38.6%
|align="center" valign=top bgcolor="lightblue"|42.3%
|align="left" valign=top bgcolor="pink"|Flavio Zanonato(Democratic Party of the Left)
|align="center" valign=top bgcolor="pink"|32.0%
|align="center" valign=top bgcolor="pink"|57.7%
|align="left" valign=top bgcolor="lightgreen" |Luigi Mariani(Italian People's Party)
|align="center" valign=top bgcolor="lightgreen"|22.3%
|align="center" valign=top bgcolor="lightgreen"|–
|align="center" valign=top bgcolor="#E9E9E9"|7.1%
|-
|align="left" valign=top bgcolor="#E9E9E9"|Vicenza
|align="left" valign=top bgcolor="lightblue" |Marino Breganze(Forza Italia)
|align="center" valign=top bgcolor="lightblue"|40.6%
|align="center" valign=top bgcolor="lightblue"|49.1
|align="left" valign=top bgcolor="pink"|Marino Quaresimin(Italian People's Party)
|align="center" valign=top bgcolor="pink"|34.4%
|align="center" valign=top bgcolor="pink"|50.9
|align="left" bgcolor="lightgreen"|Giuseppe Magnabosco(Liga Veneta–Lega Nord)
|align="center" valign=top bgcolor="lightgreen"|12.2%
|align="center" valign=top bgcolor="lightgreen"|–
|align="center" valign=top bgcolor="#E9E9E9"|12.6%
|}
Source: Regional Council of Veneto

1997 municipal elections

|- 
!align=left rowspan=2 valign=center bgcolor="#E9E9E9"|
!colspan="3" align="center" valign=top bgcolor="lightblue"|Pole for Freedoms
!colspan="3" align="center" valign=top bgcolor="pink"|The Olive Tree
!colspan="3" align="center" valign=top bgcolor="lightgreen"|Lega Nord
!colspan="1" align="center" valign=top bgcolor="#E9E9E9"|Others
|-
|align="left" bgcolor="lightblue"|candidate
|align="center" bgcolor="lightblue"|1st round
|align="center" bgcolor="lightblue"|2nd round
|align="left" bgcolor="pink"|candidate
|align="center" bgcolor="pink"|1st round
|align="center" bgcolor="pink"|2nd round
|align="left" bgcolor="lightgreen"|candidate
|align="center" bgcolor="lightgreen"|1st round
|align="center" bgcolor="lightgreen"|2nd round
|align="center" bgcolor="#E9E9E9"|1st round
|-
|align="left" valign=top bgcolor="#E9E9E9"|Venice
|align="left" valign=top bgcolor="lightblue" |Mauro Pizzigati(Forza Italia)
|align="center" valign=top bgcolor="lightblue"|20.7%
|align="center" valign=top bgcolor="lightblue"|–
|align="left" valign=top bgcolor="pink"|Massimo Cacciari(Democratic Party of the Left)
|align="center" valign=top bgcolor="pink"|64.6%
|align="center" valign=top bgcolor="pink"|–
|align="left" bgcolor="lightgreen"|Giovanni Fabris(Liga Veneta–Lega Nord)
|align="center" valign=top bgcolor="lightgreen"|10.2%
|align="center" valign=top bgcolor="lightgreen"|–
|align="center" valign=top bgcolor="#E9E9E9"|4.5%
|}
Source: Regional Council of Veneto

1998 municipal elections

|- 
!align=left rowspan=2 valign=center bgcolor="#E9E9E9"|
!colspan="3" align="center" valign=top bgcolor="lightblue"|Pole for Freedoms
!colspan="3" align="center" valign=top bgcolor="pink"|The Olive Tree
!colspan="3" align="center" valign=top bgcolor="lightgreen"|Lega Nord
!colspan="1" align="center" valign=top bgcolor="#E9E9E9"|Others
|-
|align="left" bgcolor="lightblue"|candidate
|align="center" bgcolor="lightblue"|1st round
|align="center" bgcolor="lightblue"|2nd round
|align="left" bgcolor="pink"|candidate
|align="center" bgcolor="pink"|1st round
|align="center" bgcolor="pink"|2nd round
|align="left" bgcolor="lightgreen"|candidate
|align="center" bgcolor="lightgreen"|1st round
|align="center" bgcolor="lightgreen"|2nd round
|align="center" bgcolor="#E9E9E9"|1st round
|-
|align="left" valign=top bgcolor="#E9E9E9"|Treviso
|align="left" valign=top bgcolor="lightblue" |Ferruccio Bresolin(Forza Italia)
|align="center" valign=top bgcolor="lightblue"|25.9%
|align="center" valign=top bgcolor="lightblue"|–
|align="left" valign=top bgcolor="pink"|Domenico Luciani(independent)
|align="center" valign=top bgcolor="pink"|31.3%
|align="center" valign=top bgcolor="pink"|40.5%
|align="left" bgcolor="lightgreen"|Giancarlo Gentilini(Liga Veneta–Lega Nord)
|align="center" valign=top bgcolor="lightgreen"|42.8%
|align="center" valign=top bgcolor="lightgreen"|59.5%
|align="center" valign=top bgcolor="#E9E9E9"|
|-
|align="left" valign=top bgcolor="#E9E9E9"|Verona
|align="left" valign=top bgcolor="lightblue" |Michela Sironi(Forza Italia)
|align="center" valign=top bgcolor="lightblue"|40.3%
|align="center" valign=top bgcolor="lightblue"|58.4%
|align="left" valign=top bgcolor="pink"|Giuseppe Brugnoli(Italian People's Party)
|align="center" valign=top bgcolor="pink"|30.6%
|align="center" valign=top bgcolor="pink"|41.6%
|align="left" bgcolor="lightgreen"|Francesco Girondini(Liga Veneta–Lega Nord)
|align="center" valign=top bgcolor="lightgreen"|15.9%
|align="center" valign=top bgcolor="lightgreen"|–
|align="center" valign=top bgcolor="#E9E9E9"|13.2%
|-
|align="left" valign=top bgcolor="#E9E9E9"|Vicenza
|align="left" valign=top bgcolor="lightblue" |Enrico Hüllweck(Forza Italia)
|align="center" valign=top bgcolor="lightblue"|35.7%
|align="center" valign=top bgcolor="lightblue"|56.5%
|align="left" valign=top bgcolor="pink"|Giorgio Sala(Italian People's Party)
|align="center" valign=top bgcolor="pink"|33.1%
|align="center" valign=top bgcolor="pink"|43.5%
|align="left" bgcolor="lightgreen"|Margherita Carta(Liga Veneta–Lega Nord)
|align="center" valign=top bgcolor="lightgreen"|14.0%
|align="center" valign=top bgcolor="lightgreen"|–
|align="center" valign=top bgcolor="#E9E9E9"|17.2%
|}
Source: Istituto Cattaneo

1999 municipal elections

|- 
!align=left rowspan=2 valign=center bgcolor="#E9E9E9"|
!colspan="3" align="center" valign=top bgcolor="lightblue"|Pole for Freedoms
!colspan="3" align="center" valign=top bgcolor="pink"|The Olive Tree
!colspan="3" align="center" valign=top bgcolor="lightgreen"|Lega Nord
!colspan="1" align="center" valign=top bgcolor="#E9E9E9"|Others
|-
|align="left" bgcolor="lightblue"|candidate
|align="center" bgcolor="lightblue"|1st round
|align="center" bgcolor="lightblue"|2nd round
|align="left" bgcolor="pink"|candidate
|align="center" bgcolor="pink"|1st round
|align="center" bgcolor="pink"|2nd round
|align="left" bgcolor="lightgreen"|candidate
|align="center" bgcolor="lightgreen"|1st round
|align="center" bgcolor="lightgreen"|2nd round
|align="center" bgcolor="#E9E9E9"|1st round
|-
|align="left" valign=top bgcolor="#E9E9E9"|Padua
|align="left" valign=top bgcolor="lightblue" |Giustina Destro(Forza Italia)
|align="center" valign=top bgcolor="lightblue" |42.2%
|align="center" valign=top bgcolor="lightblue"|50.5%
|align="left" valign=top bgcolor="pink"|Flavio Zanonato(Democrats of the Left)
|align="center" valign=top bgcolor="pink"|41.6%
|align="center" valign=top bgcolor="pink"|49.5%
|align="left" bgcolor="lightgreen"|Luciano Gasperini(Liga Veneta–Lega Nord)
|align="center" valign=top bgcolor="lightgreen"|4.9%
|align="center" valign=top bgcolor="lightgreen"|–
|align="center" valign=top bgcolor="#E9E9E9"|11.3%
|}
Source: Istituto Cattaneo

2000 municipal elections

|- 
!align=left rowspan=2 valign=center bgcolor="#E9E9E9"|
!colspan="3" align="center" valign=top bgcolor="lightblue"|House of Freedoms (incl. Lega Nord)
!colspan="3" align="center" valign=top bgcolor="pink"|The Olive Tree
!colspan="3" align="center" valign=top bgcolor="tomato"|PRC & Greens
!colspan="1" align="center" valign=top bgcolor="#E9E9E9"|Others
|-
|align="left" bgcolor="lightblue"|candidate
|align="center" bgcolor="lightblue"|1st round
|align="center" bgcolor="lightblue"|2nd round
|align="left" bgcolor="pink"|candidate
|align="center" bgcolor="pink"|1st round
|align="center" bgcolor="pink"|2nd round
|align="left" bgcolor="tomato"|candidate
|align="center" bgcolor="tomato"|1st round
|align="center" bgcolor="tomato"|2nd round
|align="center" bgcolor="#E9E9E9"|1st round
|-
|align="left" valign=top bgcolor="#E9E9E9"|Venice
|align="left" valign=top bgcolor="lightblue" |Renato Brunetta(Forza Italia)
|align="center" valign=top bgcolor="lightblue" |39.0%
|align="center" valign=top bgcolor="lightblue"|44.0%
|align="left" valign=top bgcolor="pink"|Paolo Costa(The Democrats)
|align="center" valign=top bgcolor="pink"|37.7%
|align="center" valign=top bgcolor="pink"|56.0%
|align="left" valign=top bgcolor="tomato"|Gianfranco Bettin(Federation of the Greens)
|align="center" valign=top bgcolor="tomato"|16.3%
|align="center" valign=top bgcolor="tomato"|with Costa
|align="center" valign=top bgcolor="#E9E9E9"|7.0%
|}
Source: La Repubblica

2001–2010

2002 municipal elections

|- 
!align=left rowspan=2 valign=center bgcolor="#E9E9E9"|
!colspan="3" align="center" valign=top bgcolor="lightblue"|House of Freedoms (incl. Lega Nord)
!colspan="3" align="center" valign=top bgcolor="pink"|The Olive Tree
!colspan="1" align="center" valign=top bgcolor="#E9E9E9"|Others
|-
|align="left" bgcolor="lightblue"|candidate
|align="center" bgcolor="lightblue"|1st round
|align="center" bgcolor="lightblue"|2nd round
|align="left" bgcolor="pink"|candidate
|align="center" bgcolor="pink"|1st round
|align="center" bgcolor="pink"|2nd round
|align="center" bgcolor="#E9E9E9"|1st round
|-
|align="left" valign=top bgcolor="#E9E9E9"|Verona
|align="left" valign=top bgcolor="lightblue" |Pierluigi Bolla(Forza Italia)
|align="center" valign=top bgcolor="lightblue" |45.6%
|align="center" valign=top bgcolor="lightblue"|45.9%
|align="left" valign=top bgcolor="pink"|Paolo Zanotto(Democracy is Freedom)
|align="center" valign=top bgcolor="pink"|38.7%
|align="center" valign=top bgcolor="pink"|54.1%
|align="center" valign=top bgcolor="#E9E9E9"|15.7%
|}
Source: La Repubblica

2003 municipal elections

|- 
!align=left rowspan=2 valign=center bgcolor="#E9E9E9"|
!colspan="3" align="center" valign=top bgcolor="lightblue"|House of Freedoms
!colspan="3" align="center" valign=top bgcolor="pink"|The Olive Tree
!colspan="3" align="center" valign=top bgcolor="lightgreen"|Lega Nord
!colspan="1" align="center" valign=top bgcolor="#E9E9E9"|Others
|-
|align="left" bgcolor="lightblue"|candidate
|align="center" bgcolor="lightblue"|1st round
|align="center" bgcolor="lightblue"|2nd round
|align="left" bgcolor="pink"|candidate
|align="center" bgcolor="pink"|1st round
|align="center" bgcolor="pink"|2nd round
|align="left" bgcolor="lightgreen"|candidate
|align="center" bgcolor="lightgreen"|1st round
|align="center" bgcolor="lightgreen"|2nd round
|align="center" bgcolor="#E9E9E9"|1st round
|-
|align="left" valign=top bgcolor="#E9E9E9"|Treviso
|align="left" valign=top bgcolor="lightblue" |Letizia Ortica(Forza Italia)
|align="center" valign=top bgcolor="lightblue"|11.2%
|align="center" valign=top bgcolor="lightblue"|–
|align="left" valign=top bgcolor="pink"|Maria Luisa Campagner(Democracy is Freedom)
|align="center" valign=top bgcolor="pink"|37.9%
|align="center" valign=top bgcolor="pink"|43.9%
|align="left" bgcolor="lightgreen"|Gian Paolo Gobbo(Liga Veneta–Lega Nord)
|align="center" valign=top bgcolor="lightgreen"|44.9%
|align="center" valign=top bgcolor="lightgreen"|56.1%
|align="center" valign=top bgcolor="#E9E9E9"|6.0%
|-
|align="left" valign=top bgcolor="#E9E9E9"|Vicenza
|align="left" valign=top bgcolor="lightblue" |Enrico Hüllwech(Forza Italia)
|align="center" valign=top bgcolor="lightblue" |43.3%
|align="center" valign=top bgcolor="lightblue"|53.8%
|align="left" valign=top bgcolor="pink"|Vincenzo Riboni(Democracy is Freedom)
|align="center" valign=top bgcolor="pink"|33.5%
|align="center" valign=top bgcolor="pink"|46.2%
|align="left" bgcolor="lightgreen"|Stefano Stefani(Liga Veneta–Lega Nord)
|align="center" valign=top bgcolor="lightgreen"|9.6%
|align="center" valign=top bgcolor="lightgreen"|with Hüllwech
|align="center" valign=top bgcolor="#E9E9E9"|13.6%
|}
Source: Istituto Cattaneo

2004 municipal elections

|- 
!align=left rowspan=2 valign=center bgcolor="#E9E9E9"|
!colspan="3" align="center" valign=top bgcolor="lightblue"|Forza Italia & National Alliance
!colspan="3" align="center" valign=top bgcolor="pink"|The Olive Tree
!colspan="3" align="center" valign=top bgcolor="lightgreen"|Lega Nord
!colspan="1" align="center" valign=top bgcolor="#E9E9E9"|Others
|-
|align="left" bgcolor="lightblue"|candidate
|align="center" bgcolor="lightblue"|1st round
|align="center" bgcolor="lightblue"|2nd round
|align="left" bgcolor="pink"|candidate
|align="center" bgcolor="pink"|1st round
|align="center" bgcolor="pink"|2nd round
|align="left" bgcolor="lightgreen"|candidate
|align="center" bgcolor="lightgreen"|1st round
|align="center" bgcolor="lightgreen"|2nd round
|align="center" bgcolor="#E9E9E9"|1st round
|-
|align="left" valign=top bgcolor="#E9E9E9"|Padua
|align="left" valign=top bgcolor="lightblue" |Giustina Destro(Forza Italia)
|align="center" valign=top bgcolor="lightblue" |33.6%
|align="center" valign=top bgcolor="lightblue"|–
|align="left" valign=top bgcolor="pink"|Flavio Zanonato(Democrats of the Left)
|align="center" valign=top bgcolor="pink"|51.9%
|align="center" valign=top bgcolor="pink"|–
|align="left" bgcolor="lightgreen"|Luciano Gasperini(Liga Veneta–Lega Nord)
|align="center" valign=top bgcolor="lightgreen"|4.3%
|align="center" valign=top bgcolor="lightgreen"|–
|align="center" valign=top bgcolor="#E9E9E9"|10.2%
|}
Source: Istituto Cattaneo

2005 municipal elections

|- 
!align=left rowspan=2 valign=center bgcolor="#E9E9E9"|
!colspan="3" align="center" valign=top bgcolor="lightblue"|House of Freedoms 
!colspan="3" align="center" valign=top bgcolor="pink"|Democrats of the Left & allies
!colspan="3" align="center" valign=top bgcolor="orange"|Democracy is Freedom & allies
!colspan="1" align="center" valign=top bgcolor="#E9E9E9"|Others
|-
|align="left" bgcolor="lightblue"|candidate
|align="center" bgcolor="lightblue"|1st round
|align="center" bgcolor="lightblue"|2nd round
|align="left" bgcolor="pink"|candidate
|align="center" bgcolor="pink"|1st round
|align="center" bgcolor="pink"|2nd round
|align="left" bgcolor="orange"|candidate
|align="center" bgcolor="orange"|1st round
|align="center" bgcolor="orange"|2nd round
|align="center" bgcolor="#E9E9E9"|1st round
|-
|align="left" valign=top bgcolor="#E9E9E9"|Venice
|align="left" valign=top bgcolor="lightblue" |Cesare Campa(Forza Italia)Raffaele Speranzon(National Alliance)
|align="center" valign=top bgcolor="lightblue" |20.3%6.2%
|align="center" valign=top bgcolor="lightblue"|–
|align="left" valign=top bgcolor="pink"|Felice Casson(Democrats of the Left)
|align="center" valign=top bgcolor="pink"|37.7%
|align="center" valign=top bgcolor="pink"|49.5%
|align="left" valign=top bgcolor="orange"|Massimo Cacciari(Democracy is Freedom)
|align="center" valign=top bgcolor="orange"|23.2%
|align="center" valign=top bgcolor="orange"|50.5%
|align="center" valign=top bgcolor="#E9E9E9"|12.6%
|}
Source: Istituto Cattaneo

2007 municipal elections

|- 
!align=left rowspan=2 valign=center bgcolor="#E9E9E9"|
!colspan="3" align="center" valign=top bgcolor="lightblue"|House of Freedoms (incl. Lega Nord)
!colspan="3" align="center" valign=top bgcolor="pink"|The Union
!colspan="1" align="center" valign=top bgcolor="#E9E9E9"|Others
|-
|align="left" bgcolor="lightblue"|candidate
|align="center" bgcolor="lightblue"|1st round
|align="center" bgcolor="lightblue"|2nd round
|align="left" bgcolor="pink"|candidate
|align="center" bgcolor="pink"|1st round
|align="center" bgcolor="pink"|2nd round
|align="center" bgcolor="#E9E9E9"|1st round
|-
|align="left" valign=top bgcolor="#E9E9E9"|Verona
|align="left" valign=top bgcolor="lightblue" |Flavio Tosi(Liga Veneta–Lega Nord)
|align="center" valign=top bgcolor="lightblue" |60.7%
|align="center" valign=top bgcolor="lightblue"|–
|align="left" valign=top bgcolor="pink"|Paolo Zanotto(Democracy is Freedom)
|align="center" valign=top bgcolor="pink"|33.9%
|align="center" valign=top bgcolor="pink"|–
|align="center" valign=top bgcolor="#E9E9E9"|5.4%
|}
Source: La Repubblica

2008 municipal elections

|- 
!align=left rowspan=2 valign=center bgcolor="#E9E9E9"|
!colspan="3" align="center" valign=top bgcolor="lightblue"|The People of Freedom & Lega Nord
!colspan="3" align="center" valign=top bgcolor="pink"|Democratic Party & allies
!colspan="1" align="center" valign=top bgcolor="#E9E9E9"|Others
|-
|align="left" bgcolor="lightblue"|candidate
|align="center" bgcolor="lightblue"|1st round
|align="center" bgcolor="lightblue"|2nd round
|align="left" bgcolor="pink"|candidate
|align="center" bgcolor="pink"|1st round
|align="center" bgcolor="pink"|2nd round
|align="center" bgcolor="#E9E9E9"|1st round
|-
|align="left" valign=top bgcolor="#E9E9E9"|Treviso
|align="left" valign=top bgcolor="lightblue" |Gian Paolo Gobbo(Liga Veneta–Lega Nord)
|align="center" valign=top bgcolor="lightblue" |50.4%
|align="center" valign=top bgcolor="lightblue"|–
|align="left" valign=top bgcolor="pink"|Franco Rosi(Democratic Party)
|align="center" valign=top bgcolor="pink"|27.4%
|align="center" valign=top bgcolor="pink"|–
|align="center" valign=top bgcolor="#E9E9E9"|22.2%
|-
|align="left" valign=top bgcolor="#E9E9E9"|Vicenza
|align="left" valign=top bgcolor="lightblue" |Amalia Sartori(Forza Italia)
|align="center" valign=top bgcolor="lightblue" |39.3%
|align="center" valign=top bgcolor="lightblue"|49.5%
|align="left" valign=top bgcolor="pink"|Achille Variati(Democratic Party)
|align="center" valign=top bgcolor="pink"|31.3%
|align="center" valign=top bgcolor="pink"|50.5%
|align="center" valign=top bgcolor="#E9E9E9"|29.4%
|}
Source: La Repubblica

2009 municipal elections

|- 
!align=left rowspan=2 valign=center bgcolor="#E9E9E9"|
!colspan="3" align="center" valign=top bgcolor="lightblue"|The People of Freedom & Lega Nord
!colspan="3" align="center" valign=top bgcolor="pink"|Democratic Party & allies
!colspan="1" align="center" valign=top bgcolor="#E9E9E9"|Others
|-
|align="left" bgcolor="lightblue"|candidate
|align="center" bgcolor="lightblue"|1st round
|align="center" bgcolor="lightblue"|2nd round
|align="left" bgcolor="pink"|candidate
|align="center" bgcolor="pink"|1st round
|align="center" bgcolor="pink"|2nd round
|align="center" bgcolor="#E9E9E9"|1st round
|-
|align="left" valign=top bgcolor="#E9E9E9"|Padua
|align="left" valign=top bgcolor="lightblue"|Marco Marin(The People of Freedom)
|align="center" valign=top bgcolor="lightblue"|44.9%
|align="center" valign=top bgcolor="lightblue"|48.0%
|align="left" valign=top bgcolor="pink"|Flavio Zanonato(Democratic Party)
|align="center" valign=top bgcolor="pink"|45.7%
|align="center" valign=top bgcolor="pink"|52.0%
|align="center" valign=top bgcolor="#E9E9E9"|9.4%
|}
Source: La Repubblica

2010 municipal elections

|- 
!align=left rowspan=2 valign=center bgcolor="#E9E9E9"|
!colspan="3" align="center" valign=top bgcolor="lightblue"|The People of Freedom & Lega Nord
!colspan="3" align="center" valign=top bgcolor="pink"|Democratic Party & allies
!colspan="1" align="center" valign=top bgcolor="#E9E9E9"|Others
|-
|align="left" bgcolor="lightblue"|candidate
|align="center" bgcolor="lightblue"|1st round
|align="center" bgcolor="lightblue"|2nd round
|align="left" bgcolor="pink"|candidate
|align="center" bgcolor="pink"|1st round
|align="center" bgcolor="pink"|2nd round
|align="center" bgcolor="#E9E9E9"|1st round
|-
|align="left" valign=top bgcolor="#E9E9E9"|Venice
|align="left" valign=top bgcolor="lightblue" |Renato Brunetta(The People of Freedom)
|align="center" valign=top bgcolor="lightblue" |42.6%
|align="center" valign=top bgcolor="lightblue"|–
|align="left" valign=top bgcolor="pink"|Giorgio Orsoni(Democratic Party)
|align="center" valign=top bgcolor="pink"|51.1%
|align="center" valign=top bgcolor="pink"|–
|align="center" valign=top bgcolor="#E9E9E9"|6.3%
|}
Source: La Repubblica

2011–present

2012 municipal elections

|- 
!align=left rowspan=2 valign=center bgcolor="#E9E9E9"|
!colspan="3" align="center" valign=top bgcolor="lightgreen"|Lega Nord
!colspan="3" align="center" valign=top bgcolor="lightblue"|The People of Freedom
!colspan="3" align="center" valign=top bgcolor="pink"|Democratic Party & allies
!colspan="3" align="center" valign=top bgcolor="orange"|Five Star Movement
!colspan="1" align="center" valign=top bgcolor="#E9E9E9"|Others
|-
|align="left" bgcolor="lightgreen"|candidate
|align="center" bgcolor="lightgreen"|1st round
|align="center" bgcolor="lightgreen"|2nd round
|align="left" bgcolor="lightblue"|candidate
|align="center" bgcolor="lightblue"|1st round
|align="center" bgcolor="lightblue"|2nd round
|align="left" bgcolor="pink"|candidate
|align="center" bgcolor="pink"|1st round
|align="center" bgcolor="pink"|2nd round
|align="left" bgcolor="orange"|candidate
|align="center" bgcolor="orange"|1st round
|align="center" bgcolor="orange"|2nd round
|align="center" bgcolor="#E9E9E9"|1st round
|-
|align="left" valign=top bgcolor="#E9E9E9"|Verona
|align="left" bgcolor="lightgreen"|Flavio Tosi(Liga Veneta–Lega Nord)
|align="center" valign=top bgcolor="lightgreen"|57.3%
|align="center" valign=top bgcolor="lightgreen"|–
|align="left" valign=top bgcolor="lightblue"|Luigi Castelletti(The People of Freedom)
|align="center" valign=top bgcolor="lightblue"|8.9%
|align="center" valign=top bgcolor="lightblue"|–
|align="left" valign=top bgcolor="pink"|Michele Bertucco(Democratic Party)
|align="center" valign=top bgcolor="pink"|22.7%
|align="center" valign=top bgcolor="pink"|–
|align="left" valign=top bgcolor="orange" |Gianni Benciolini(Five Star Movement)
|align="center" valign=top bgcolor="orange"|9.3%
|align="center" valign=top bgcolor="orange"|–
|align="center" valign=top bgcolor="#E9E9E9"|1.8%
|}
Source: La Repubblica

2013 municipal elections

|- 
!align=left rowspan=2 valign=center bgcolor="#E9E9E9"|
!colspan="3" align="center" valign=top bgcolor="lightgreen"|Lega Nord & The People of Freedom
!colspan="3" align="center" valign=top bgcolor="pink"|Democratic Party & allies
!colspan="3" align="center" valign=top bgcolor="orange"|Five Star Movement
!colspan="3" align="center" valign=top bgcolor="#CCCCFF"|Local list & Civic Choice
!colspan="1" align="center" valign=top bgcolor="#E9E9E9"|Others
|-
|align="left" bgcolor="lightgreen"|candidate
|align="center" bgcolor="lightgreen"|1st round
|align="center" bgcolor="lightgreen"|2nd round
|align="left" bgcolor="pink"|candidate
|align="center" bgcolor="pink"|1st round
|align="center" bgcolor="pink"|2nd round
|align="left" bgcolor="orange"|candidate
|align="center" bgcolor="orange"|1st round
|align="center" bgcolor="orange"|2nd round
|align="left" bgcolor="#CCCCFF"|candidate
|align="center" bgcolor="#CCCCFF"|1st round
|align="center" bgcolor="#CCCCFF"|2nd round
|align="center" bgcolor="#E9E9E9"|1st round
|-
|align="left" valign=top bgcolor="#E9E9E9"|Treviso
|align="left" bgcolor="lightgreen"|Giancarlo Gentilini(Liga Veneta–Lega Nord)
|align="center" valign=top bgcolor="lightgreen"|35.8%
|align="center" valign=top bgcolor="lightgreen"|44.5%
|align="left" valign=top bgcolor="pink"|Giovanni Manildo(Democratic Party)
|align="center" valign=top bgcolor="pink"|42.5%
|align="center" valign=top bgcolor="pink"|55.5%
|align="left" valign=top bgcolor="orange" |Alessandro Gnocchi(Five Star Movement)
|align="center" valign=top bgcolor="orange"|6.9%
|align="center" valign=top bgcolor="orange"|–
|align="left" valign=top bgcolor="#CCCCFF"|Massimo Zanetti(independent)
|align="center" valign=top bgcolor="#CCCCFF"|10.6%
|align="center" valign=top bgcolor="#CCCCFF"|–
|align="center" valign=top bgcolor="#E9E9E9"|5.1%
|-
|align="left" valign=top bgcolor="#E9E9E9"|Vicenza
|align="left" bgcolor="lightgreen"|Manuela Dal Lago(Liga Veneta–Lega Nord)
|align="center" valign=top bgcolor="lightgreen"|27.4%
|align="center" valign=top bgcolor="lightgreen"|–
|align="left" valign=top bgcolor="pink"|Achille Variati(Democratic Party)
|align="center" valign=top bgcolor="pink"|53.5%
|align="center" valign=top bgcolor="pink"|–
|align="left" valign=top bgcolor="orange" |Liliana Zaltron(Five Star Movement)
|align="center" valign=top bgcolor="orange"|6.5%
|align="center" valign=top bgcolor="orange"|–
|align="left" valign=top bgcolor="#CCCCFF"|–
|align="center" valign=top bgcolor="#CCCCFF"|–
|align="center" valign=top bgcolor="#CCCCFF"|–
|align="center" valign=top bgcolor="#E9E9E9"|12.6%
|}
Source: La Repubblica

2014 municipal elections

|- 
!align=left rowspan=2 valign=center bgcolor="#E9E9E9"|
!colspan="3" align="center" valign=top bgcolor="lightgreen"|Lega Nord & Forza Italia
!colspan="3" align="center" valign=top bgcolor="pink"|Democratic Party & allies
!colspan="3" align="center" valign=top bgcolor="#CCCCFF"|Local list & New Centre-Right
!colspan="3" align="center" valign=top bgcolor="#E9E9E9"|Padua2020 (local list)
!colspan="1" align="center" valign=top bgcolor="#E9E9E9"|Others
|-
|align="left" bgcolor="lightgreen"|candidate
|align="center" bgcolor="lightgreen"|1st round
|align="center" bgcolor="lightgreen"|2nd round
|align="left" bgcolor="pink"|candidate
|align="center" bgcolor="pink"|1st round
|align="center" bgcolor="pink"|2nd round
|align="left" bgcolor="#CCCCFF"|candidate
|align="center" bgcolor="#CCCCFF"|1st round
|align="center" bgcolor="#CCCCFF"|2nd round
|align="left" bgcolor="#E9E9E9"|candidate
|align="center" bgcolor="#E9E9E9"|1st round
|align="center" bgcolor="#E9E9E9"|2nd round
|align="center" bgcolor="#E9E9E9"|1st round
|-
|align="left" valign=top bgcolor="#E9E9E9"|Padua
|align="left" bgcolor="lightgreen"|Massimo Bitonci(Liga Veneta–Lega Nord)
|align="center" valign=top bgcolor="lightgreen"|31.4%
|align="center" valign=top bgcolor="lightgreen"|53.5%
|align="left" valign=top bgcolor="pink"|Ivo Rossi(Democratic Party)
|align="center" valign=top bgcolor="pink"|33.8%
|align="center" valign=top bgcolor="pink"|46.5%
|align="left" valign=top bgcolor="#CCCCFF"|Maurizio Saia(independent)
|align="center" valign=top bgcolor="#CCCCFF"|10.6%
|align="center" valign=top bgcolor="#CCCCFF"|with Bitonci
|align="left" valign=top bgcolor="#E9E9E9" |Francesco Fiore(Padua2020, Green Italia)
|align="center" valign=top bgcolor="#E9E9E9"|9.9%
|align="center" valign=top bgcolor="#E9E9E9"|with Rossi
|align="center" valign=top bgcolor="#E9E9E9"|14.3%
|}
Source: La Repubblica

2015 municipal elections

|- 
!align=left rowspan=2 valign=center bgcolor="#E9E9E9"|
!colspan="3" align="center" valign=top bgcolor="lightblue"|Local list & Forza Italia
!colspan="3" align="center" valign=top bgcolor="pink"|Democratic Party & allies
!colspan="3" align="center" valign=top bgcolor="orange"|Five Star Movement
!colspan="3" align="center" valign=top bgcolor="lightgreen"|Lega Nord
!colspan="1" align="center" valign=top bgcolor="#E9E9E9"|Others
|-
|align="left" bgcolor="lightblue"|candidate
|align="center" bgcolor="lightblue"|1st round
|align="center" bgcolor="lightblue"|2nd round
|align="left" bgcolor="pink"|candidate
|align="center" bgcolor="pink"|1st round
|align="center" bgcolor="pink"|2nd round
|align="left" bgcolor="orange"|candidate
|align="center" bgcolor="orange"|1st round
|align="center" bgcolor="orange"|2nd round
|align="left" bgcolor="lightgreen"|candidate
|align="center" bgcolor="lightgreen"|1st round
|align="center" bgcolor="lightgreen"|2nd round
|align="center" bgcolor="#E9E9E9"|1st round
|-
|align="left" valign=top bgcolor="#E9E9E9"|Venice
|align="left" valign=top bgcolor="lightblue"|Luigi Brugnaro(independent)
|align="center" valign=top bgcolor="lightblue"|28.6%
|align="center" valign=top bgcolor="lightblue"|53.2%
|align="left" valign=top bgcolor="pink"|Felice Casson(Democratic Party)
|align="center" valign=top bgcolor="pink"|38.0%
|align="center" valign=top bgcolor="pink"|46.8%
|align="left" valign=top bgcolor="orange" |Davide Scano(Five Star Movement)
|align="center" valign=top bgcolor="orange"|12.6%
|align="center" valign=top bgcolor="orange"|–
|align="left" bgcolor="lightgreen"|Gian Angelo Bellati(independent)
|align="center" valign=top bgcolor="lightgreen"|11.9%
|align="center" valign=top bgcolor="lightgreen"|with Brugnaro
|align="center" valign=top bgcolor="#E9E9E9"|8.9%
|}
Source: La Repubblica

2017 municipal elections

|- 
!align=left rowspan=2 valign=center bgcolor="#E9E9E9"|
!colspan="3" align="center" valign=top bgcolor="lightgreen"|Lega Nord & Forza Italia
!colspan="3" align="center" valign=top bgcolor="pink"|Democratic Party & allies
!colspan="3" align="center" valign=top bgcolor="orange"|Five Star Movement
!colspan="3" align="center" valign=top bgcolor="#E9E9E9"|Other party
!colspan="1" align="center" valign=top bgcolor="#E9E9E9"|Others
|-
|align="left" bgcolor="lightgreen"|candidate
|align="center" bgcolor="lightgreen"|1st round
|align="center" bgcolor="lightgreen"|2nd round
|align="left" bgcolor="pink"|candidate
|align="center" bgcolor="pink"|1st round
|align="center" bgcolor="pink"|2nd round
|align="left" bgcolor="orange"|candidate
|align="center" bgcolor="orange"|1st round
|align="center" bgcolor="orange"|2nd round
|align="left" bgcolor="#E9E9E9"|candidate
|align="center" bgcolor="#E9E9E9"|1st round
|align="center" bgcolor="#E9E9E9"|2nd round
|align="center" bgcolor="#E9E9E9"|1st round
|-
|align="left" valign=top bgcolor="#E9E9E9"|Padua
|align="left" bgcolor="lightgreen"|Massimo Bitonci(Liga Veneta–Lega Nord)
|align="center" valign=top bgcolor="lightgreen"|40.9%
|align="center" valign=top bgcolor="lightgreen"|48.2%
|align="left" valign=top bgcolor="pink"|Sergio Giordani(independent)
|align="center" valign=top bgcolor="pink"|29.2%
|align="center" valign=top bgcolor="pink"|51.8%
|align="left" valign=top bgcolor="orange"|Simone Borile(Five Star Movement)
|align="center" valign=top bgcolor="orange"|5.3%
|align="center" valign=top bgcolor="orange"|–
|align="left" valign=top bgcolor="#E9E9E9" |Arturo Lorenzoni(Civic Coalition)
|align="center" valign=top bgcolor="#E9E9E9"|22.8%
|align="center" valign=top bgcolor="#E9E9E9"|with Giordani
|align="center" valign=top bgcolor="#E9E9E9"|1.8%
|-
|align="left" valign=top bgcolor="#E9E9E9"|Verona
|align="left" bgcolor="lightgreen"|Federico Sboarina(Forza Italia)
|align="center" valign=top bgcolor="lightgreen"|29.1%
|align="center" valign=top bgcolor="lightgreen"|58.1%
|align="left" valign=top bgcolor="pink"|Orietta Salemi(Democratic Party)
|align="center" valign=top bgcolor="pink"|22.4%
|align="center" valign=top bgcolor="pink"|–
|align="left" valign=top bgcolor="orange"|Alessandro Gennari(Five Star Movement)
|align="center" valign=top bgcolor="orange"|9.5%
|align="center" valign=top bgcolor="orange"|–
|align="left" valign=top bgcolor="#E9E9E9" |Patrizia Bisinella(Tosi List for Veneto, Act!)
|align="center" valign=top bgcolor="#E9E9E9"|23.5%
|align="center" valign=top bgcolor="#E9E9E9"|41.9%
|align="center" valign=top bgcolor="#E9E9E9"|15.5%
|}
Source: La Repubblica

2018 municipal elections

|- 
!align=left rowspan=2 valign=center bgcolor="#E9E9E9"|
!colspan="3" align="center" valign=top bgcolor="lightgreen"|Lega Nord & Forza Italia
!colspan="3" align="center" valign=top bgcolor="pink"|Democratic Party & allies
!colspan="3" align="center" valign=top bgcolor="orange"|Five Star Movement
!colspan="1" align="center" valign=top bgcolor="#E9E9E9"|Others
|-
|align="left" bgcolor="lightgreen"|candidate
|align="center" bgcolor="lightgreen"|1st round
|align="center" bgcolor="lightgreen"|2nd round
|align="left" bgcolor="pink"|candidate
|align="center" bgcolor="pink"|1st round
|align="center" bgcolor="pink"|2nd round
|align="left" bgcolor="orange"|candidate
|align="center" bgcolor="orange"|1st round
|align="center" bgcolor="orange"|2nd round
|align="center" bgcolor="#E9E9E9"|1st round
|-
|align="left" valign=top bgcolor="#E9E9E9"|Treviso
|align="left" bgcolor="lightgreen"|Mario Conte(Liga Veneta–Lega Nord)
|align="center" valign=top bgcolor="lightgreen"|54.5%
|align="center" valign=top bgcolor="lightgreen"|–
|align="left" valign=top bgcolor="pink"|Giovanni Manildo(Democratic Party)
|align="center" valign=top bgcolor="pink"|37.6%
|align="center" valign=top bgcolor="pink"|–
|align="left" valign=top bgcolor="orange"|Domenico Losappio(Five Star Movement)
|align="center" valign=top bgcolor="orange"|4.2%
|align="center" valign=top bgcolor="orange"|–
|align="center" valign=top bgcolor="#E9E9E9"|3.6%
|-
|align="left" valign=top bgcolor="#E9E9E9"|Vicenza
|align="left" bgcolor="lightgreen"|Francesco Rucco(independent)
|align="center" valign=top bgcolor="lightgreen"|50.6%
|align="center" valign=top bgcolor="lightgreen"|–
|align="left" valign=top bgcolor="pink"|Otello Dalla Rosa(Democratic Party)
|align="center" valign=top bgcolor="pink"|45.9%
|align="center" valign=top bgcolor="pink"|–
|align="left" valign=top bgcolor="orange"|–
|align="center" valign=top bgcolor="orange"|–
|align="center" valign=top bgcolor="orange"|–
|align="center" valign=top bgcolor="#E9E9E9"|3.5%
|}
Source: La Repubblica

2020 municipal elections

|- 
!align=left rowspan=2 valign=center bgcolor="#E9E9E9"|
!colspan="3" align="center" valign=top bgcolor="lightblue"|Local list–Lega–FI–FdI
!colspan="3" align="center" valign=top bgcolor="pink"|Democratic Party & allies
!colspan="3" align="center" valign=top bgcolor="orange"|Five Star Movement
!colspan="1" align="center" valign=top bgcolor="#E9E9E9"|Others
|-
|align="left" bgcolor="lightblue"|candidate
|align="center" bgcolor="lightblue"|1st round
|align="center" bgcolor="lightblue"|2nd round
|align="left" bgcolor="pink"|candidate
|align="center" bgcolor="pink"|1st round
|align="center" bgcolor="pink"|2nd round
|align="left" bgcolor="orange"|candidate
|align="center" bgcolor="orange"|1st round
|align="center" bgcolor="orange"|2nd round
|align="center" bgcolor="#E9E9E9"|1st round
|-
|align="left" valign=top bgcolor="#E9E9E9"|Venice
|align="left" valign=top bgcolor="lightblue"|Luigi Brugnaro(independent)
|align="center" valign=top bgcolor="lightblue"|54.1%
|align="center" valign=top bgcolor="lightblue"|–
|align="left" valign=top bgcolor="pink"|Pier Paolo Baretta(Democratic Party)
|align="center" valign=top bgcolor="pink"|29.3%
|align="center" valign=top bgcolor="pink"|–
|align="left" valign=top bgcolor="orange" |Sara Visman(Five Star Movement)
|align="center" valign=top bgcolor="orange"|3.9%
|align="center" valign=top bgcolor="orange"|–
|align="center" valign=top bgcolor="#E9E9E9"|12.7%
|}
Source: La Repubblica

2022 municipal elections

|- 
!align=left rowspan=2 valign=center bgcolor="#E9E9E9"|
!colspan="3" align="center" valign=top bgcolor="pink"|Democratic Party & allies
!colspan="3" align="center" valign=top bgcolor="lightgreen"|Lega & Brothers of Italy
!colspan="3" align="center" valign=top bgcolor="#E9E9E9"|Other party
!colspan="1" align="center" valign=top bgcolor="#E9E9E9"|Others
|-
|align="left" bgcolor="pink"|candidate
|align="center" bgcolor="pink"|1st round
|align="center" bgcolor="pink"|2nd round
|align="left" bgcolor="lightgreen"|candidate
|align="center" bgcolor="lightgreen"|1st round
|align="center" bgcolor="lightgreen"|2nd round
|align="left" bgcolor="#E9E9E9"|candidate
|align="center" bgcolor="#E9E9E9"|1st round
|align="center" bgcolor="#E9E9E9"|2nd round
|align="center" bgcolor="#E9E9E9"|1st round
|-
|align="left" valign=top bgcolor="#E9E9E9"|Padua
|align="left" valign=top bgcolor="pink"|Sergio Giordani(independent)
|align="center" valign=top bgcolor="pink"|58.4%
|align="center" valign=top bgcolor="pink"|–
|align="left" bgcolor="lightgreen"|Francesco Peghin(independent)
|align="center" valign=top bgcolor="lightgreen"|33.5%
|align="center" valign=top bgcolor="lightgreen"|–
|align="left" valign=top bgcolor="#E9E9E9" |–
|align="center" valign=top bgcolor="#E9E9E9"|–
|align="center" valign=top bgcolor="#E9E9E9"|–
|align="center" valign=top bgcolor="#E9E9E9"|7.0%
|-
|align="left" valign=top bgcolor="#E9E9E9"|Verona
|align="left" valign=top bgcolor="pink"|Damiano Tommasi(independent)
|align="center" valign=top bgcolor="pink"|39.8%
|align="center" valign=top bgcolor="pink"|53.4%
|align="left" bgcolor="lightgreen"|Federico Sboarina(Brothers of Italy)
|align="center" valign=top bgcolor="lightgreen"|32.7%
|align="center" valign=top bgcolor="lightgreen"|46.6%
|align="left" valign=top bgcolor="#E9E9E9" |Flavio Tosi(Act!, Forza Italia)
|align="center" valign=top bgcolor="#E9E9E9"|23.5%
|align="center" valign=top bgcolor="#E9E9E9"|41.9%
|align="center" valign=top bgcolor="#E9E9E9"|3.6%
|}
Source: La Repubblica

See also
 
 
 

Elections in Veneto
Veneto
Veneto
Venice
Padua
Events in Treviso
Vicenza
Verona